Ljubine  is a village in the municipalities of Ribnik, Republika Srpska and Ključ, Bosnia and Herzegovina.

Demographics 
According to the 2013 census, its population was 26, all Serbs living in the Ribnik part, with no one living in the Ključ part.

References

Populated places in Ključ
Populated places in Ribnik